George Williams (1882–1939) was an English footballer who played in the Football League for Wolverhampton Wanderers.

References

1882 births
1939 deaths
English footballers
Association football midfielders
English Football League players
Wolverhampton Wanderers F.C. players